Collection of Outstanding Figures of the Zen Garden (Hán tự: 禪苑集英) is a Chinese-language Vietnamese Buddhist biographical text dating to 1337. It connects the history of Buddhism in Vietnam with China and has aspects of a Dharma transmission text modelled on The Transmission of the Lamp genre.

References

Vietnamese books
Zen texts
Vietnamese Buddhist texts
Trần dynasty literature
Chinese-language literature of Vietnam